LeadGenius is a privately held software as a service, marketing automation, and demand generation startup located in Berkeley, California.  The company uses a combination of artificial intelligence and human computation to identify and communicate with targeted sales leads.  The company's crawlers comb through websites, business directories, government filings, and credit data to train a machine learning system for business-to-business sales.

LeadGenius is the first crowdsourcing company to set a minimum wage for its workers tied to the cost of living in the country they are working in.

The company launched in Y Combinator’s Summer 2011 class under the name MobileWorks. It has since raised $6 million in venture funding from investors such as Sierra Ventures, Andreessen Horowitz, Alexis Ohanian, Mitch Kapor, Dave McClure, and Sam Altman.

References

Privately held companies based in California
Companies based in Berkeley, California
Companies established in 2011
2011 establishments in California